Alexandra Sophia Handal is a Palestinian artist, filmmaker and essayist with a transnational upbringing. Based in Europe since 2004, Handal continues to spend extended periods of time in Palestine.

Biography 
Handal's exilic life has taken her to diverse corners of the world.  She was born into a Bethlehemite, Palestinian family in Port-au-Prince, Haiti in 1975 during the dictatorship of Jean-Claude Duvalier. Her family eventually moved to the Santo Domingo, Dominican Republic, where Handal spent her teenage years. She went on to pursue art at Boston University, where she obtained a BFA in Painting and Minor in Art History in 1997, followed by an MA in Studio Art from New York University in 2001. In 2004, Handal was granted a UAL Research Studentship Award to undertake a practice/theory PhD at the University of the Arts London, graduating in 2011. During her postgraduate studies, she was member of the research centre: TrAIN (Transnational Art, Identity and Nation). After living ten years in London, Handal moved for a moment in Amsterdam, The Netherlands, before residing in Berlin, Germany with her family, where she has established her studio.

Art 

Handal had her first solo museum exhibition, Memory Flows Like the Tide at Dusk at the Museet for Samtidskunst, Roskilde, Denmark (September–December 2016). New works were shown alongside existing ones, bringing together her multi-faceted study of artworks on collective loss. In 2007, she began conducting oral historical fieldwork with Palestinian refugees and exiles from West Jerusalem. She used this original research material to create a body of work that investigates the ramifications of psychological, mental and physical borders, bringing to the fore personal narratives of dispossession and displacement. The museum published a catalogue to accompany Handal's solo exhibition that focused on the divided city of Jerusalem. In a conversation with curator Alia Rayyan in Charting Terrains from Outside the Grid, Handal discusses how different facets of migratory experience has shaped her cultural sphere:

For the past three generations, displacement has been a constant in my family. The enduring wars and conflicts in the Middle East can be attributed to this cycle of dislocation... I have experienced no other form of belonging but that of an outsider. However, what this meant transformed over time from being a space of alienation to one of novelty, where new imaginings are possible. Having multiple affiliations means that I am never seen completely as an insider. And yet, while I have never known what it means to be wholly part of one country, I have ties and access to many, whether they are legal, cultural, historical, linguistic or sentimental. From where I stand, I observe things from the outside in and from the inside out. This gives me an understanding of knowledge gaps such as what has been forgotten, excluded, erased and ignored. In fact, the outsider can see things that others – even those in power – are unable to see from their position. I had identified in the term outsider, a whole new meaning. I realised that ‘outside’ or ‘inside’ is actually a matter of power structures (national, academic, gender, social). This awareness was liberating. It opened a space for me to chart a whole new cultural terrain that includes all of me.

Among the works on exhibit at the museum was her ongoing mammoth project, Dream Homes Property Consultants (DHPC). This interactive web documentary art’ has been in the making since 2007. It was an Official Selection at IDFA DocLab (2013), where it had its international premiere. It was included in a number of festivals such as UXdoc Rencontres internationales du documentaire de Montreal (2014), Przemiany Interdisciplinary Festival at the Copernicus Science Center, Warsaw, Picturing Palestine: Film Screening and Panel Discussion at Modern Art Oxford for Israeli Apartheid Week (2015) and After the Last Sky Festival in Berlin (2016). Dream Homes Property Consultants (DHPC) won the 2014 Lumen People's Choice Gold Award (UK), 2015 Second Prize for the Freedom Flowers Foundation Award (Switzerland) and it was Shortlisted for the 2013 Artraker Award (UK). DHPC was noted as being the ‘first independently produced interactive web documentary by an artist-filmmaker from the MENA region’. Since 2014, DHPC has been among the 20 most viewed web documentary on the MIT Open Documentary Lab, which is a ‘curated database of the people, projects, and technologies transforming documentary in the digital age’. On the occasion of the 10th Edition of IDFA DocLab (2016), an international panel composed of new media curators, producers, acclaimed artists and specialists in the field of ‘undefined non-fiction storytelling and art’  were invited to choose projects that made the most impact in the past decade. Dream Homes Property Consultants (DHPC) was among the 100 seminal works that were selected for the anniversary publication of IDFA DocLab Canon of Interactive Documentary Booklet.

Another work that was part of Handal's solo exhibition was her experimental short, From the Bed & Breakfast Notebooks. It was selected for New Contemporaries  2009 – an open submission juried exhibition that takes place annually since 1949 and showcases the works of emerging talents from British art schools. Studio International Magazine called her film a 'quietly powerful political engagement', while the Chair of Bloomberg New Contemporaries, Sasha Craddock described it as ‘poetic and gentle’. Handal was mentioned in The Guardian among the 'few names to watch'. The selectors for 2009 consisted of: John Stezaker, Ellen Gallagher, Saskia Olde Wolbers and Wolfgang Tillmans.

Publications and conferences 

Handal has presented papers at a number of conferences where art intersects with other fields of knowledge, reflecting on themes of memory, history, power, knowledge and geographical imagination in her work. She participated in the Art and Geographical Knowledge  at the Royal Geographical Society with IBG, Annual International Conference, Manchester, UK (2009), the [Record] [Create]: Oral History in Art, Craft, and Design  at the Oral History Society Annual Conference in association with the Victoria and Albert Museum London (2010) and the Art and Resistance Conference  organised by Dar al-Kalima University, Bethlehem, Palestine (2016). Handal contributed an essay ‘Chronicle from the Field’ for the book, Oral History in the Visual Arts  (Bloomsbury Publishing) edited by Matthew Partington and Linda Sandino, which introduces the role of oral history across the arts, from the perspective of international practitioners and scholars.

References

External links 
 
 
 
 

1975 births
Living people
Palestinian women artists
Palestinian film directors